The Aikinetocystidae are a family of parasitic alveolates in the phylum Apicomplexa. The species in this family infect oligochaetes.

Taxonomy

This family was created in 1930 by Bhatia.

Two genera are recognised in this family - Aikinetocystis and Nellocystis.

Description

The species in this family infect the coelom of oligochaetes. They are spread by the oral-faecal route. The trophozoite is aseptate.  The gamont is sac-like and extends at one end into two branches which divide dichotomously, forming eight to 16 secondary branches bearing groups of suckers.  The oocysts are biconical (fusiform).

References

Apicomplexa families